Padarvand-e Olya (also Romanized as Pādarvand-e ‘Olyā; also known as Bādervand-e ‘Olyā) is a village in Rumiani Rural District, Suri District, Rumeshkhan County, Lorestan Province, Iran. At the 2006 census, its population was 645, in 121 families.

References 

Populated places in Rumeshkhan County